In functional analysis, a branch of mathematics, the distortion problem is to determine by how much one can distort the unit sphere in a given Banach space using an equivalent norm.  Specifically, a Banach space X is called λ-distortable if there exists an equivalent norm |x| on X such that, for all infinite-dimensional subspaces Y in X,

(see distortion (mathematics)). Note that every Banach space is trivially 1-distortable. A Banach space is called distortable if it is λ-distortable for some λ > 1 and it is called arbitrarily distortable if it is  λ-distortable for any λ.

James proved that c0 and ℓ1 are not distortable.

In separable  and uniform convex  spaces, distortability is easily seen to be  equivalent to the ostensibly more general question of whether or not every real-valued Lipschitz function ƒ defined on the sphere in X stabilizes on the sphere of an infinite dimensional subspace, i.e., whether there is a real number a ∈ R so that for every δ > 0 there is an infinite dimensional subspace Y of X, so that |a − ƒ(y)| < δ, for all y ∈ Y, with ||y|| = 1. In a separable Hilbert space, the distortion problem is equivalent to the question of whether there exist subsets of the unit sphere  separated by a positive distance and yet intersect every infinite-dimensional closed subspace. Unlike many properties of Banach spaces, the distortion problem seems to be as difficult on Hilbert spaces as on other Banach spaces.
.

See also
 Tsirelson space
Banach space

References

.
.
.
.
.
.

Functional analysis